Cahit Paşa (born 25 August 1973) is a Turkish former professional footballer who played as a midfielder. He played for Bornovaspor, Kuşadasıspor, Efesspor, Kartalspor, Konyaspor, Karşıyaka S.K., Aksarayspor, Siirtspor, Yalovaspor, Kastamonuspor, Gölcükspor and Alibeyköyspor in Turkey and for Portadown in Northern Ireland.

Career
Paşa was born in Kardzhali, Bulgaria.

He played for Konyaspor in the Turkish 2. League A during the 2001–02 season, appearing in 31 league matches.

In January 2008 Paşa joined Northern Irish Premier League side Portadown.

References

1973 births
Living people
People from Kardzhali
Bulgarian Turks in Turkey
Bulgarian emigrants to Turkey
Turkish footballers
Association football midfielders
Portadown F.C. players
Kartalspor footballers
Karşıyaka S.K. footballers
Konyaspor footballers
Aksarayspor footballers
Yalovaspor footballers
Gölcükspor footballers
Bornovaspor footballers
Kastamonuspor footballers
Turkish expatriate footballers
Turkish expatriate sportspeople in the United Kingdom
Expatriate association footballers in Northern Ireland